Ciise Aden Abshir (born 1 June 1986) is a Somali international footballer who has played in Norway, Malta and Tanzania in addition to his homeland. He last played for Norwegian second-tier club Ullensaker/Kisa IL. He's one of the most capped player's for Somalia national football team.

He joined Asker in mid-2012 from Nybergsund, where he had played for half a year. Ahead of the 2014 season he rejoined Eidsvold Turn. Abshir was a captain when Somalia beat Tanzania in cecafe 3-November 2009 before being succeeded as captain by Hasan Babay.

Honours
 Somalia League
 Winners (5) 2000, 2001, 2002, 2003, 2004
 Tanzanian Premier League
 Winners (1) 2004
Norway cup winners, with L.S.K
 winners. (1)2007 NM. Norway

References

1986 births
Living people
Somalian footballers
Sportspeople from Mogadishu
Association football defenders
Elman FC players
Simba S.C. players
Pietà Hotspurs F.C. players
Lillestrøm SK players
Eidsvold TF players
Elverum Fotball players
Nybergsund IL players
Asker Fotball players
KFUM-Kameratene Oslo players
Ullensaker/Kisa IL players
Maltese Premier League players
Norwegian Second Division players
Norwegian First Division players
Somalia international footballers
Somalian expatriate footballers
Expatriate footballers in Tanzania
Expatriate footballers in Malta
Expatriate footballers in Norway
Somalian expatriate sportspeople in Norway
Tanzanian Premier League players